The West Lechitic dialects (or West Lekhitic dialects) are a group of extinct Lechitic dialects, used by the Slavic peoples of Pomerania, Margraviate of Brandenburg, Mecklenburg and the lands on the lower and middle Elbe. At the same time, the dialects of Central Pomerania and Gdańsk Pomerania are usually considered transitional between West Lechic and East Lechic (i.e. all traditional dialects of the Polish language except Kashubian) and are called the Middle Lechitic dialect group.

Phonetic features 
Among the distinctive phonetic features of the West Lechitic area were:
 The almost complete absence of the metathesis TorT into TroT (like in the Polish area), cf.
 The fusion of TolT and TelT into a single TolT, which after metathesis gave TlåT or TloT, cf. Polabian ,  <  *solma, *melka. There were also toponyms without a metathesis, e.g. , 
, cf.
Polish Byczyna, Bystre, Przemyśl.
 The mixing of the anlaut *o- and *vo-, which connects the West Lechitic area with Greater Poland, Lusatia and most of the area of Bohemia proper and West Moravia, cf.

Division 
West Lechitic dialects include:
 West Pomeranian dialect
 Mecklenburgian subdialects: as for the division of Mecklenburgian dialects into groups, it is uncertain. Maria Jeżowa argues that they did not differ in any significant way, while the isophones, plotted by Tadeusz Milewski, are not supported by toponomastic material. Tadeusz-Lehr Slawinski, using these isophones, proposed the following division:
 Rani dialect
 northwestern Rani subdialects
 southeastern Rani subdialects
 Veleti dialect
 Obotrite dialect
 Drevani dialect – Polabian language
 Marcho-Magdeburgian dialect

References

Bibliography 
 
 
 
 
 
 

Lechitic languages
Extinct Slavic languages
Languages of Germany